Jesus Sánchez López (born 22 January 1996), commonly known as Chechu, is a Spanish professional footballer who plays as a defender.

Career
Chechu was born in La Línea de la Concepción, province of Cádiz. He finished his formation with Recreativo de Huelva's youth setup, and made his senior debuts with the reserves in the 2013–14 campaign, in Tercera División.

On 4 January 2014 Chechu played his first match as a professional, starting in a 0–2 loss against Córdoba CF at the Estadio Nuevo Arcángel, in the Segunda División championship.

References

External links

1996 births
Living people
Spanish footballers
Footballers from La Línea de la Concepción
Association football defenders
Atlético Onubense players
Recreativo de Huelva players
Segunda División players
Tercera División players